El Barro humano is a 1955 Argentine film, directed and written by Luis César Amadori and based on the theater play by Luis Rodríguez Acassuso.  The movie was released on May 2, 1955, and rated PG 16.

Cast
Zully Moreno as Mercedes Romero de Vargas Peña
Carlos López Moctezuma as Eduardo Vargas Peña
Juan José Míguez as Octavio Reyes
Jorge Salcedo as Fiscal
Nelly Panizza as Elisa Márbiz
Felisa Mary as Clara
Héctor Calcaño as Felipe Romero
Ricardo Galache as Néstor Rómulo
Domingo Sapelli as Presidente del tribunal

References

External links
 

1955 films
1950s Spanish-language films
Argentine black-and-white films
Films directed by Luis César Amadori
Argentine romantic drama films
1955 romantic drama films
1950s Argentine films